WZ-8, is a hypersonic unmanned aerial vehicle produced by Aviation Industry Corporation of China (AVIC). It was officially introduced on China's 70th anniversary military parade simply as a "strategic reconnaissance aircraft".

Design and development
WZ-8 was observed in Chinese Airforce experimental test bases by military analysts on satellite images. The vehicle was revealed to the public on 1 October 2019 and was subsequently displayed at Zhuhai Airshow in 2021.

WZ-8 is a supersonic-hypersonic, remotely operated, high-altitude reconnaissance vehicle. The aircraft bears some resemblance to the DF-17 hypersonic glide ballistic missile and the American Lockheed D-21 reconnaissance drone, albeit different in overall dimensions, propulsions, and speed. The drone is launched by a 'mothership', such as Xi'an H-6K bomber, at its appropriate launch attitude. The intended roles include general reconnaissance, pre-attack target assessment, and intelligence gathering. The drone's high altitude and speed allow it to fill up intelligence needs in a combat environment where satellite support is unsustainable, such as repeated fly-over above specific areas of interest.

Operators

People's Liberation Army Air Force
 10th Bomber Division, Anqing Airbase

Specifications

See also
North American X-15
Lockheed D-21
Ryan Model 147

References

Unmanned military aircraft of China
Unmanned stealth aircraft